South Chicago (91st Street) was a commuter rail station on the Metra Electric District's South Chicago branch at East 91st Street and South Baltimore Avenue in Chicago's South Chicago neighborhood. The station provided service to the South Chicago, South Deering, Hegewisch, and East Side neighborhoods. In Metra's zone-based fare system, 91st Street was in zone B.

In 2001, Metra constructed a new terminal two blocks south at 93rd Street to replace this station. The new South Chicago station was dedicated June 4, 2001.

References

Former Illinois Central Railroad stations
Metra stations in Chicago
Railway stations closed in 2001